The Mare Island San Pablo Bay Trail is a walking trail on Mare Island in Vallejo, California.

It runs along the west side of Mare Island, near San Pablo Bay. It has views of the bay and mountains, including Mount Diablo and Mount Tamalpais.

The trail encircles a U. S. Navy Base Realignment and Closure Investigation Area.

The trail has been lit for holiday events.

Gallery

References

Trails in the San Francisco Bay Area
Hiking trails in California
Mare Island